Mianzu (also Romanized as Mīānzū, Mīān Zū, Meyānsū, Mīānzow, Miyan Zoo, and Mīyān Zow) is a village in Gifan Rural District, Garmkhan District, Bojnord County, North Khorasan Province, Iran. At the 2006 census, its population was 443, in 118 families.

References 

Populated places in Bojnord County